The 1955 Delaware Fightin' Blue Hens football team was an American football team that represented the University of Delaware as an independent during the 1955 college football season. In its fifth season under head coach David M. Nelson, the team compiled an 8–1 record and outscored opponents by a total of 261 to 82. Vincent Grande was the team captain. The team played its home games at Delaware Stadium in Newark, Delaware.

Schedule

References

Delaware
Delaware Fightin' Blue Hens football seasons
Delaware Fightin' Blue Hens football